Neues Geistliches Lied (new spiritual song), abbreviated NGL, is a music genre of songs in German intended for church usage, and based on contemporary lyrics and with music by contemporary composers.

History 
The idea to reach young people by new songs for church services began in the 1950s. The first song in the genre was in 1955 Seigneur, mon ami by Père Duval who performed his religious chansons at the Protestant church assembly Kirchentag in 1962. Christians looked for an expression for reformation of thoughts and liturgy in the churches. The Protestant Evangelische Akademie Tutzing organised competitions, initiated by the minister for students (Studentenpfarrer) in Munich, Günther Hegele. The first competition in 1962 received 996 entries, the first prize went to "Danke" with text and music by Martin Gotthard Schneider. "Stern über Bethlehem" was written by Alfred Hans Zoller for the third competition in 1964, and became a common song of the star singers. Musicals by Andrew Lloyd Webber, in 1968 Joseph and the Amazing Technicolor Dreamcoat and in 1970 Jesus Christ Superstar, nourished tendencies to write more new music for young people.

In 1972, Peter Janssens introduced the term Sacropop to Germany, for a fusion of sacred texts and musical styles derived from pop and rock. A 2001 study, presented at the Überdiözesane Fachtagung Neues Geistliches Lied reported more than 1895 choirs and bands active in the field of NGL. The songs became an established medium in services. Christoph Kießig of a Berlin band noted: "Das NGL ist eine der wenigen Stellen, an denen Jugendliche und Erwachsene nicht nur konsumieren." (The NGL is one of the few fields where adults and young people don't only consume.)  wrote in 2003 that only songs that congregations like to sing in services are truly NGL ("Denn nur was sich bewährt, bleibt in den Gemeinden lebenden und wird als Neues Geistliches Lied praktiziert."). New elements compared to traditional hymns are rhythms with syncopes and stresses on the offbeat, contemporary lyrics, and melodies that can be easily learned.

Songbooks 
Collections of NGL were for example in 1970 Jericho, edited by Karl Natiesta and Tom Runggaldier, and a year later in Schalom – Ökumenisches Liederbuch (Schalom – Ecumenical songbook).

A 14th edition of this song book appeared in 2013.

Other song books have included
 1986: 
 1994: Cantate I, 2007: Cantate II'''
The second version of the Catholic hymnal Gotteslob has included NGL in its main section from 2013.

 Initiative in Limburg 
The Catholic Diocese of Limburg established in 1971 a work group for church music and youth (Arbeitskreis Kirchenmusik und Jugendseelsorge im Bistum Limburg). It established means of publication to familiarise congregations and musicians with new songs. Members have included Horst Christill, Patrick Dehm, Eugen Eckert, Dietmar Fischenich, Winfried Heurich, Joachim Raabe and Peter Reulein. A new group has been dedicated especially to NGL.

The group initiated more than books for choir books and song books, including:
 1994 Vom Leben singen, choir book, 188 songs 
 1999 die Zeit färben, choir and band book, 161 songs
 2003 Lass dein Licht leuchten, choir book, 103 songs
 2008 Weil du da bist – Kinder-Gotteslob, song book, 380 songs
 2009 Weil der Himmel uns braucht, choir and band book, 200 songs
 2011 Junges Gotteslob – Ein Segen sein, song book, 720 songs

 Literature 
 Peter Hahnen: Das Neue Geistliche Lied als zeitgenössische Komponente christlicher Spiritualität. 2nd ed, LIT-Verlag, Münster 2003, .
 Peter Hahnen: Liederzünden! Theologie und Geschichte des Neuen Geistlichen Liedes. Lahn-Verlag/Haus Altenberg, Kevelaer/Düsseldorf 2009, .
 Dorothea Monninger (ed.): Neue Geistliche Lieder. Töne – Texte – Temperamente. Arbeitsstelle Gottesdienst der EKD, Informations- und Korrespondenzblatt, 16th year, issue 2 (2002).
 Peter Deckert: Literatur zum Neuen Geistlichen Lied. Bücher, Zeitschriftenartikel, collected references from thesises related to "Neues Geistliches Lied (NGL) – Sacro-Pop – Religiöse Popularmusik“. Köln 1975–2016.
 Bernward Hofmann (collection): Troubadour für Gott – Neue Geistliche Lieder. 6. Auflage. Kolping-Bildungswerk Diözesanverband Würzburg e.V., Würzburg 1999.
 Peter Bubmann: Das "Neue Geistliche Lied" als Ausdrucksmedium religiöser Milieus. In: Zeithistorische Forschungen/Studies in Contemporary History'' 7 (2010), pp 460–468.

References

External links 
 Dokumentation "Neues geistliches Lied"  (in German) Evangelische Kirche von Kurhessen-Waldeck. Landeskirchliches Archiv
 Hitparade der Jungen Gemeinde (Folge 1) / 10 Klassiker der Evangelischen Jugend Philipp Greifenstein 2013

 
Music genres
Contemporary Christian music
German language
German church music